Benzylmercapturic acid is a minor metabolite of toluene in humans and is used in the diagnosis of toluene exposure. As its name indicates, is a benzyl derivative of mercapturic acid (acetylcysteine).

References

Thioethers
Amino acid derivatives
Benzyl compounds